This is a recap of the 1981 season for the Professional Bowlers Association (PBA) Tour.  It was the tour's 23rd season, and consisted of 33 events. 1981 was a season of "fours" for Earl Anthony. He won an unprecedented fourth PBA Player of the Year award (his first since 1976), and captured his fourth PBA National Championship among his four titles on the season.

Marshall Holman, who had served a suspension for part of the 1980 season, came back strong to win three titles in 1981, taking his second career major at the BPAA U.S. Open. Steve Cook was the titlist at the Firestone Tournament of Champions.

Tournament schedule

References

External links
1981 Season Schedule

Professional Bowlers Association seasons
1981 in bowling